Since the 1950s, London's primary passenger airport has been at Heathrow, with a second one at Gatwick. London's third airport may refer to:

 London City Airport
 London Stansted Airport
 Luton Airport

 The abandoned plans for Cublington Airport, and various proposals for a Thames Estuary Airport, all of which would have replaced Heathrow if built.

Airports in the London region